Federal Route 86, also known as Jalan Jelebu or Jalan Seremban–Simpang Pertang, is a main federal roads in Negeri Sembilan, Malaysia. The roads connects Seremban town in the south to Simpang Pertang, Jelebu in the north. It was the earliest federal roads in Negeri Sembilan, built in 1911 by the Federated Malay States (FMS) government.

Route background
The Kilometre Zero of the Federal Route 86 starts at Seremban. The road meets with LEKAS Highway  and Jalan Tok Dagang  at Ampangan. The road then continues on to Pantai, ascending the Titiwangsa Mountains as a mountain pass, and eventually crosses the Seremban - Jelebu district boundary. The Federal Route 86 passes through the centre of Kuala Klawang and continues its way to Simpang Pertang, ending its route at the intersection with the Federal Route 9  at Simpang Pertang.

Features
At most sections, the Federal Route 86 was built under the JKR R5 road standard, allowing maximum speed limit of up to 90 km/h
, although it can be 30km/h at windy areas such as Jeram Toi.

List of junctions and towns

References

Malaysian Federal Roads